Herpetogramma sphingealis  is a small species of moth of the family Crambidae. It was described as a new species in 2011.

Taxonomy
Herpetogramma sphingealis was described by Louis Handfield and Daniel Handfield in 2011.

Etymology
The Latin name sphingealis refers to the sphingid-like appearance of the males.

Description
The underside of the head, thorax and abdomen, including the legs, are pure white, so it is easily spotted when flying towards a light trap.

Imagoes, adult moths, are sexually dimorphic. The wingspan is 34–37 mm for males and 31–34 mm for females. Males are nearly uniform dark brown. The hind-wings are dark brown with a dark discal spot. Females have more apically-squared wings and are less uniformly dark coloured.

Distribution
It is found from southern Quebec southward in eastern United States to Georgia and Louisiana and as far west as Arkansas.

Ecology

Behaviour
The moth is readily attracted to light traps and flies around at the beginning of the night. It is sometimes one of the first species to come to a light trap. Its flight is darting and rapid. 

The caterpillars have been recorded feeding on Polystichum acrostichoides and might also feed on other species of ferns. They roll the fronds of their host plant.

Habitat
It occurs in the darkest areas of rich xeric forests, with maples and oaks, especially rocky, hilly, maple groves where Christmas fern, Polystichum acrostichoides, commonly occurs. With its dark-brown colour the moth is cryptically coloured in its natural habitat and well adapted to hide in the darkest shadows of the woods.

References

Moths described in 2011
Herpetogramma
Moths of North America